Kathleen "Katie" Fallon (born October 25, 1976) is an American non-fiction author and essayist. Her essays have appeared in numerous literary journals, both electronic and print, and received several accolades. In 2011, she published her first book, Cerulean Blues: A Personal Search for a Vanishing Songbird. She currently resides in Cheat Neck, WV with her husband Jesse, where she teaches creative writing at nearby West Virginia University. Much of Fallon's writing is grounded in naturalism and conservation efforts, especially concerning raptors and other birds.

Personal life 
Fallon was born in Wilkes-Barre, Pennsylvania and grew up in Dallas, Pennsylvania. Both her parents were public school teachers. Her family has a long coal-mining heritage in both Pennsylvania and West Virginia. Fallon founded the Avian Conservation Center of Appalachia, Inc., a nonprofit organization dedicated to conserving wild birds through scientific research, public outreach, rescue and rehabilitation. She and her veterinarian husband live with their two daughters, Laurel and Cora.

Education 
Fallon began her undergraduate studies as a Wildlife and Fisheries Science major at Pennsylvania State University, and soon switched to English. She received her MFA in Creative Nonfiction from West Virginia University.

Career and work 
Fallon taught English at Virginia Tech and currently teaches at West Virginia University. Numerous published essays of hers have won awards and nominations, including several nominations for the Pushcart Prize. She has published two books, titled Cerulean Blues: A Personal Search for a Vanishing Songbird and Vulture: The Private Life of an Unloved Bird.  Among other nature writers, she cites Edward Abbey and Terry Tempest Williams as influences.

Awards and nominations 
 Reed Award for Outstanding Writing on the Southern Environment finalist
 “Hill of the Sacred Eagles,” finalist in Terrain‘s 2011 essay contest
 The Tusculum Review’s Featured Artist in November 2011
 "The Bottom Field," finalist in Phoebe's 2013 nonfiction contest
 "Rebirth" listed as "Notable" in Best American Science and Nature Writing, 2014

Works

Books 
 Cerulean Blues: A Personal Search for a Vanishing Songbird (Ruka Press, November 2011)
 Vulture: The Private Life of an Unloved Bird (ForeEdge, March 2017)

Essays 
 Fourth Genre, “With Hurt Hawks." 2006.
 River Teeth, “Rebirth,” 2013, and "The Vulture Tree," 2005. 
 Ecotone, "Ghosts in the Woodshed." 2006.
 Bark Magazine, “An Ear to Stroke: Throwaway Dogs Provide Comfort during Frightening Times." 2011.
 Appalachian Heritage, “Morning Glories.” 2005.
 Now & Then, “Goose.” 2008.
 Isotope, “The Youngest Eagle.” 2010.
 Fourth River, “Lost.” 2007.
 the minnesota review, "Solitaire." 2013. 
 The Tusculum Review, "Grave Robbers." 2012.
 Terrain, "Hill of the Sacred Eagles."  2011.
 New River Gorge Adventure Guide, “Losing Ground.” 2011.
 Rivendell, “Away from Home.” 2007.
 Pine Mountain Sand & Gravel,  “Fall Migration.” 2009. 
 Touchstone, “Cave Darkness.” 2001.

References

External links
 Radio Interview

 Author Website
 WVU Professorial Page
 Minnesota Review interview 
 Alumni Spotlight

1976 births
Living people
21st-century American memoirists
People from Wilkes-Barre, Pennsylvania
Writers from West Virginia
West Virginia University alumni
People from Monongalia County, West Virginia
American women essayists
American women memoirists
Women science writers
American nature writers
Writers from Pennsylvania
Pennsylvania State University alumni
Virginia Tech faculty
West Virginia University faculty
21st-century American women writers
21st-century American essayists
American women academics